Ed and His Dead Mother is a 1993 American dark comedy film starring Steve Buscemi, Miriam Margolyes, and Ned Beatty.

Plot 
Ed Chilton inherits his family's hardware store following the death of his beloved mother, Mabel. He lives with his maternal uncle, Benny, who appears to be happy that his annoying sister is out of his life. One morning, Ed is approached at work by salesman A. J. Peddle, who offers to resurrect Ed's mother for $1000. Ed is skeptical, but Peddle insists that it must be done immediately, as she has been dead for too long to risk further delays. Ed accepts, which disturbs Uncle Benny, who believes the act to be unethical. Over time, Mabel's behavior becomes increasingly bizarre and unacceptable. When she begins scaring the neighbors and chasing dogs with a knife, Ed is forced to admit that something is wrong. He seeks help from Peddle, but the salesman wants more money. Eventually, Ed accepts that he must move on and let his mother die. Out of self-defense, he decapitates Mabel and later says goodbye to her, but the head comes back to life and bites him on the lip when he gives her a final kiss. Disgusted, he throws the head into the grave, finally free of his overbearing mother.

Cast 
 Steve Buscemi as Ed Chilton
 Ned Beatty as Uncle Benny
 John Glover as A. J. Pattle
 Miriam Margolyes as Mabel Chilton
 Sam Jenkins as Storm Reynolds
 Gary Farmer as Big Lar
 Jon Gries as Rob Sundheimer

Release 
ITC Entertainment released Ed and His Dead Mother to a single theater in Los Angeles. It made $673.  Fox Entertainment Group released it on home video in January 1994, and Pathfinder Home Entertainment released it on DVD in June 2003.

Reception 
Rotten Tomatoes, a review aggregator, reports that 50% of six surveyed critics gave the film a positive review; the average rating is 5.4/10.  Kevin Thomas of the Los Angeles Times wrote that "flat, uninspired direction" ruins the film despite the cast and script.  Adam Tyner of DVD Talk rated it 2/5 stars and called it a "limp and lifeless" film that does not stack up to Dead Alive.  Patrick Naugle of DVD Verdict called it a cult film that plays like a watered-down, PG-rated version of Dead Alive.

Conversely, Stina Chyn of Film Threat rated it 4/5 stars and called it "an eccentric gem". Author Glenn Kay wrote that the film initially frustrated horror film fans due to its lack of gore, but it offers "plenty of chuckles" to open-minded viewers.

References

External links

1993 films
1990s comedy horror films
American independent films
American comedy horror films
American zombie comedy films
ITC Entertainment films
Films set in Iowa
Films scored by Mason Daring
1993 comedy films
1990s English-language films
1990s American films